Victoria Petrovna Lopyreva (born 26 July 1983) is a Russian television presenter, actress, model, blogger, and beauty pageant titleholder who was crowned Miss Russia 2003. She was an official ambassador of the FIFA World Cup 2018 in Russia.

As a model, Lopyreva has appeared in magazines such as Cosmopolitan, Gala, Future Television, L'Officiel, Beauty, Beauty Unlimited, NRG, OK!, and HELLO!. She also was a director of the Miss Russia pageant for a period of time. In 2006, Lopyreva hosted the Miss Europe pageant held in Ukraine. In 2008, she took part in the Russian version of Survivor, Last Hero.

Early life
Victoria Lopyreva (Russian: Виктория Лопырёва) was born in Rostov-on-Don, Russian SFSR, Soviet Union 28 July 1983. In 2002, she won the "Donbass_Open fest", in 2003 – "Miss Russia Awards" and moved to Moscow. In 2006, Victoria started working in the Central Television.

In 2019, her little boy was born in Miami.

Model career
Award winner of "Super Model of the World" – 2000
Miss Russian Photo – 2001
Miss Russia – 2003

TV
TV anchor of "Miss Europe Awards" on central European TV channels
TV anchor of the show "Football Night" on NTV
TV anchor of the show "The real sport" on Post TV-2009
TV anchor of the show "Happiness! The video version" on the "U" channel
TV anchor "Fashion ambulance" on MUZ TV since 2011
MUZ TV FASHION CHART TV anchor since 2012

Football

Lopyreva was a co-anchor of the "Football Night" TV show in 2007. She said she got seriously interested in football after that.

References

External links
 Victoria Lopyreva Official site

1983 births
Living people
Russian female models
Miss Russia winners
Russian television presenters
Mass media people from Rostov-on-Don
Russian women television presenters
Actors from Rostov-on-Don
Rostov State University of Economics alumni